Habrocestum inquinatum is a jumping spider species in the genus Habrocestum that lives on the mainland in Yemen and the Socotra Archipelago. The female was first described in 2002. The spider shares similarities with Habrocestum gibbosum, living in a similar geography and sharing morphological characteristics.

References

Fauna of Socotra
Salticidae
Spiders described in 2002
Spiders of Asia
Taxa named by Wanda Wesołowska